DXDX (105.5 FM) Radyo Pilipinas is a radio station owned and operated by Philippine Broadcasting Service. The station's studio is located in Iligan Medical Center College, San Miguel Village, Brgy. Pala-o, Iligan.

References

Radio stations in Iligan
Radio stations established in 2018